Matilda of Brandenburg may refer to:
Mathilde von Brandenburg (c. 1210–1261) - wife of Duke Otto I of Lüneburg
Matilda of Brandenburg (d. 1298) (c. 1270–bef. 1298) - wife of Duke Henry IV Probus of Wrocław